Lala Abdul Rashid or Abdul Rashid (1 June 1922 – 8 March 1988) was a member of Pakistan's gold medal winning 1960 Olympic field hockey team. He played as a goalkeeper throughout the tournament.

Early life and education
Born in Rawalpindi, British India on 1 June 1922, he originated from a Kashmiri Butt family whose parents migrated from Kashmir in early 1900s. He studied at Danny's High School in Rawalpindi and then joined Gordon College (Pakistan), where he played hockey. After graduation, he was selected to play for University of Punjab, Lahore and played for them in 1942.

International career
Rashid represented Pakistan at the Olympics and was part of the team that won the gold medal at the 1960 Rome Olympics. During the whole tournament only one goal was scored against Pakistan whereas Lala Abdul Rashid was able to stop all the scoring efforts by other teams. Pakistan won the Olympics gold in field hockey for the first time since independence of Pakistan in 1947. Abdul Rashid also served as the team coach of Pakistan in the late 1970s. He also held the position of Asian Hockey Federation general manager for few months, but quickly stepped down. He was highly respected in the hockey world and was instrumental in raising field hockey's profile to an international level, winning an emerging player award in 1960. Rashid died in Rawalpindi on 8 March 1988 at the age of 65.

Awards and recognition
Pride of Performance Award by the President of Pakistan in 1970.

See also
Muhammad Rashid (field hockey, born 1941)

References

External links
 

1922 births
1988 deaths
Field hockey players from Rawalpindi
Field hockey players at the 1960 Summer Olympics
Olympic field hockey players of Pakistan
Pakistani male field hockey players
Olympic medalists in field hockey
Recipients of the Pride of Performance
Medalists at the 1960 Summer Olympics
Olympic gold medalists for Pakistan
Government Gordon College alumni
20th-century Pakistani people